Ningxiang Economic and Technological Development Zone (abbr: NETZ) is an economic and technical development zone (ETZ) in Ningxiang City, Hunan Province, China, one of four ETZs at state level in Changsha. It is the original Ningxiang Private Economy Industrial Park created on 16 February, 1998, renamed to Ningxiang Technological Industrial Park in March, 2000. On 4 November, 2002, it was formally renamed to the present name, and approved to an ETZ at provincial level. On 11 November, 2010, it was upgraded to an ETZ at state level.

The plan control areas of Ningxiang ETZ consists of parts of Chengjiao, Shuangjiangkou and Jinghuapu, of which are 10 villages (or communities) of Chengjiao, 3 villages of Jinghuapu and one village of Shuangjiangkou. The main industries in the zone consists of Food and Drink, Advanced Material, advanced equipment manufacturing, health product and cosmetics.

References

Ningxiang
Economy of Changsha
1998 establishments in China
Special Economic Zones of China